Nagbhir Junction railway station (station code: NAB) is a junction railway station on Gondia–Nagbhir–Balharshah line and Nagpur–Nagbhir line in Nagpur SEC railway division of South East Central Railway Zone of Indian Railways. It serves Nagbhid town in Chandrapur district in Maharashtra state in India. It is located at 246 m above sea level and has two platforms. 12 trains stop at this station.

History
The –Nagbhir– line was opened for traffic in 1908. The Nagbhir–Rajoli line was opened in 1913 and extended up to Chanda Fort.

Work for conversion to broad gauge of the  narrow-gauge Gondia–Chanda Fort line started in December 1992. The conversion was completed and the section re-opened on 2 July 1999. The Gondia–Nagbhir–Balharshah line was electrified in 2018. The doubling of this section is under process. The Nagpur–Nagbhir section is under conversion to broad gauge as of 2019. The electrification of the section is being done simultaneously.

References

Railway stations in Chandrapur district
Nagpur SEC railway division
Railway junction stations in Maharashtra